Small G protein signaling modulator 1 (SGSM1) also known as RUN and TBC1 domain-containing protein 2 (RUTBC2)  and nurr1-interacting protein (NuIP) is a protein in humans that is encoded by the SGSM1 gene.

References